Jandi massacre was a premediated massacre of 31 Bengali Hindus in the Jandi village of Tujarpur Union under Bhanga Upazila of Faridpur District of East Pakistan on 2 May 1971 by the occupying Pakistan Army in collaboration with the Razakars during the Bangladesh Liberation War. According to sources, 31 Bengali Hindus were killed by the Pakistani Forces and the Razakars.

Events 
After the forces of the Pakistan Army entered Faridpur on April 21 and carried out the Sree Angan massacre, news of this spread like wildfire all across Faridpur, shocking the Hindus there. Immediately the Hindus left Faridpur town and migrated to safe houses in the Faridpur district for safety. One amongst them was a Hindu businessman Tonic Sen, who left Faridpur along with his family to a relative's home in Jandi village for shelter. Tonic Sen was a sympathiser of the Awami League and has helped the Muktijoddhas through fuel and ammunition during the Bangladesh Liberation War.The Forces and Razakars, in the search for Awami League sympathisers, was trying to trace Tonic Sen.

On May 2, 1971, Pakistan Forces along with the razakars reached Jandi village and surrounded the village to prevent anyone from escaping. They then rounded up all the Hindus in the village, and then the men were killed with burst fire from machine guns while the women were raped and killed.

Aftermath 
Every year, residents of Jandi village along with Ishangopalpur village organise a commemorative function to remember the people who lost their lives in the hands of the forces and Razakars.

See also 

 Sree Angan massacre
 Ishangopalpur massacre

References 

1971 Bangladesh genocide
Massacres of Bengali Hindus in East Pakistan
1971 in Bangladesh
Persecution of Hindus
Persecution by Muslims
Massacres in 1971
Massacres committed by Pakistan in East Pakistan
May 1971 events in Asia